Michael Kramer (born 1967 in Cologne) is a German radio astronomer and astrophysicist. He currently serves as a Director at the Max Planck Institute for Radio Astronomy in Bonn. He is also a professor at the University of Manchester and an Honorary Professor at the University of Bonn.

Awards 
The Royal Astronomical Society, London, honoured Michael Kramer with the 2013 Herschel Medal for his work in the field of gravitational physics.

He gave the 2016 George Darwin lecture with the title, `Probing Einstein's Universe and its physics – the joy of being curious.’

He was one of the recipients of the 2020 Breakthrough Prize in Fundamental Physics, as a member of the Event Horizon Telescope Collaboration.

References

21st-century German astronomers
German astrophysicists
1967 births
Scientists from Cologne
Living people
Academics of the University of Manchester
Max Planck Institute directors